Namar (also Romanized as Namār; also known as Namārestāq, Namāristāq, and Namāristōq) is a village in Larijan-e Sofla Rural District, Larijan District, Amol County, Mazandaran Province, Iran. At the 2006 census, its population was 165, in 48 families.

References 

Populated places in Amol County